The first battle of Uji is famous and important for having opened the Genpei War.

In early 1180, Prince Mochihito, the Minamoto Clan's favored claimant to the Imperial Throne, was chased by Taira forces to the Mii-dera, a temple just outside Kyoto. Due to the interference of a Mii-dera monk with Taira sympathies, the Minamoto army arrived too late to help defend the temple.

Minamoto no Yorimasa and Prince Mochihito, along with a force of about fifteen hundred men including the warrior monks of Mii-dera and the Watanabe clan, fled south towards Nara. They crossed the Uji River, just outside the Byōdō-in, and tore up the planks of the bridge behind them to prevent the Taira from following.

Three warrior monks in particular are named in the Heike Monogatari: Gochi-in no Tajima, Tsutsui Jōmyō Meishū, and Ichirai Hōshi. These three, along with the other monks of Mii-dera, fought with bow and arrow, a variety of swords, daggers and naginata.

As for the Taira troops, they were led by Ashikaga Tadatsuna, one of the few warriors of direct Minamoto descent who stayed loyal to his oath to the Taira family up until he and his father were murdered by one of their retainers, Kiryū Rokurō. According to Azuma Kagami, the 18-year-old Tadatsuna is supposedly remembered as having had the strength of one hundred men, a voice that echoed over 10 li (5 km), and teeth of 1 sun (3.03 cm) long. Further stating that "there will be no warrior in future ages like this Tadatsuna."

Led by their young general, the Taira force soon began to ford the river and caught up with the Minamoto. Tadatsuna was the first warrior on the frontline and following a custom of the period is said to have proclaimed his name and lineage before charging his enemies. Yorimasa tried to help the Imperial Prince get away, but was struck with an arrow in the right elbow. While his sons, Nakatsuna and Kanetsuna were fighting to fend off their enemies, Yorimasa committed seppuku. And it is said that "Yorimasa committed seppuku in a way that was to set the standard for generations to come." While as for Prince Mochihito, he was captured and killed shortly after the battle by the Taira clan.

References

Bibliography 
 Turnbull, Stephen (2003). Japanese Warrior Monks AD 949-1603. Oxford: Osprey Publishing.

1180s in Japan
1180 in Asia
Uji 1180
Uji 1180
Japanese imperial history